Athletics at the 2019 Parapan American Games in Lima, Peru were held in the VIDENA Athletics Stadium .

Medal table
Brazil topped the medal table with 82 medals.

Medalists

Men's events

Women's events

Universal events

See also
Athletics at the 2019 Pan American Games

References

Footnotes

General
 
 Result system

2019 Parapan American Games
2019 Parapan
Athletics at the Parapan American Games
Parapan American Games